Darwin River is an outer suburban area in Darwin. The name of the locality derived from the Darwin River which flows through the locality.

References

External links

Suburbs of Darwin, Northern Territory